Prensa Libre is a Guatemalan newspaper published in Guatemala City by Prensa Libre, S.A. and distributed nationwide. It was formerly the most widely circulated newspaper in the country and as of 2007 it has the second-widest circulation. It is considered a local newspaper of record. It was founded in 1951.

The billionaire Mario López Estrada is a minority stakeholder.

In March 2015, the newspapers correspondent Danilo Lópéz was killed in an attack during a public event. In the aftermath of the death of Julio René Alvarado, the Prensa Libre publicly mocked Belizean officials who called on Guatemala for an apology.  In October 2018, based on the information of an article published by the Prensa Libre, Donald Trump claimed that ISIS members were hiding within the Central American migrant caravans.

See also
 List of newspapers in Guatemala

References

External links

  

Newspapers published in Guatemala
1951 establishments in Guatemala